The arrondissement of Chalon-sur-Saône is an arrondissement of France in the Saône-et-Loire department in the Bourgogne-Franche-Comté region. It has 142 communes.

Composition

The communes of the arrondissement of Chalon-sur-Saône, and their INSEE codes, are:

 Allerey-sur-Saône (71003)
 Allériot (71004)
 Aluze (71005)
 Barizey (71019)
 Beaumont-sur-Grosne (71026)
 Bey (71033)
 Bissey-sous-Cruchaud (71034)
 Bissy-sous-Uxelles (71036)
 Bissy-sur-Fley (71037)
 Les Bordes (71043)
 Bouzeron (71051)
 Boyer (71052)
 Bragny-sur-Saône (71054)
 Bresse-sur-Grosne (71058)
 Burnand (71067)
 Buxy (71070)
 Cersot (71072)
 Chagny (71073)
 Chalon-sur-Saône (71076)
 Chamilly (71078)
 Champagny-sous-Uxelles (71080)
 Champforgeuil (71081)
 Change (71085)
 Chapaize (71087)
 La Chapelle-de-Bragny (71089)
 La Charmée (71102)
 Charnay-lès-Chalon (71104)
 Charrecey (71107)
 Chassey-le-Camp (71109)
 Châtel-Moron (71115)
 Châtenoy-en-Bresse (71117)
 Châtenoy-le-Royal (71118)
 Chaudenay (71119)
 Cheilly-lès-Maranges (71122)
 Chenôves (71124)
 Ciel (71131)
 Clux-Villeneuve (71578)
 Collonge-en-Charollais (71139)
 Cormatin (71145)
 Crissey (71154)
 Culles-les-Roches (71159)
 Curtil-sous-Burnand (71164)
 Damerey (71167)
 Demigny (71170)
 Dennevy (71171)
 Dezize-lès-Maranges (71174)
 Dracy-le-Fort (71182)
 Écuelles (71186)
 Épervans (71189)
 Étrigny (71193)
 Farges-lès-Chalon (71194)
 Fley (71201)
 Fontaines (71202)
 Fragnes-la-Loyère (71204)
 Genouilly (71214)
 Gergy (71215)
 Germagny (71216)
 Gigny-sur-Saône (71219)
 Givry (71221)
 Granges (71225)
 Guerfand (71228)
 Jambles (71241)
 Jugy (71245)
 Jully-lès-Buxy (71247)
 Laives (71249)
 Lalheue (71252)
 Lans (71253)
 Lessard-le-National (71257)
 Longepierre (71262)
 Lux (71269)
 Malay (71272)
 Mancey (71274)
 Marcilly-lès-Buxy (71277)
 Marnay (71283)
 Mellecey (71292)
 Mercurey (71294)
 Messey-sur-Grosne (71296)
 Montagny-lès-Buxy (71302)
 Montceaux-Ragny (71308)
 Montcoy (71312)
 Mont-lès-Seurre (71315)
 Moroges (71324)
 Nanton (71328)
 Navilly (71329)
 Oslon (71333)
 Palleau (71341)
 Paris-l'Hôpital (71343)
 Pontoux (71355)
 Le Puley (71363)
 Remigny (71369)
 Rosey (71374)
 Rully (71378)
 Saint-Ambreuil (71384)
 Saint-Boil (71392)
 Saint-Bérain-sur-Dheune (71391)
 Saint-Cyr (71402)
 Saint-Denis-de-Vaux (71403)
 Saint-Désert (71404)
 Saint-Didier-en-Bresse (71405)
 Sainte-Hélène (71426)
 Saint-Gengoux-le-National (71417)
 Saint-Germain-lès-Buxy (71422)
 Saint-Gervais-en-Vallière (71423)
 Saint-Gilles (71425)
 Saint-Jean-de-Vaux (71430)
 Saint-Léger-sur-Dheune (71442)
 Saint-Loup-de-Varennes (71444)
 Saint-Loup-Géanges (71443)
 Saint-Marcel (71445)
 Saint-Mard-de-Vaux (71447)
 Saint-Martin-d'Auxy (71449)
 Saint-Martin-du-Tartre (71455)
 Saint-Martin-en-Bresse (71456)
 Saint-Martin-en-Gâtinois (71457)
 Saint-Martin-sous-Montaigu (71459)
 Saint-Maurice-des-Champs (71461)
 Saint-Maurice-en-Rivière (71462)
 Saint-Privé (71471)
 Saint-Rémy (71475)
 Saint-Sernin-du-Plain (71480)
 Saint-Vallerin (71485)
 Sampigny-lès-Maranges (71496)
 Santilly (71498)
 Sassangy (71501)
 Sassenay (71502)
 Saules (71503)
 Saunières (71504)
 Savianges (71505)
 Savigny-sur-Grosne (71507)
 Sennecey-le-Grand (71512)
 Sercy (71515)
 Sermesse (71517)
 Sevrey (71520)
 Toutenant (71544)
 Varennes-le-Grand (71555)
 Vaux-en-Pré (71563)
 Verdun-sur-le-Doubs (71566)
 Verjux (71570)
 Vers (71572)
 Villegaudin (71577)
 Villeneuve-en-Montagne (71579)
 Virey-le-Grand (71585)

History

The arrondissement of Chalon-sur-Saône was created in 1800. In January 2017 it gained six communes from the arrondissement of Autun, one commune from the arrondissement of Charolles and eight communes from the arrondissement of Mâcon, and it lost 14 communes to the arrondissement of Autun, seven communes to the arrondissement of Louhans and one commune to the arrondissement of Mâcon.

As a result of the reorganisation of the cantons of France which came into effect in 2015, the borders of the cantons are no longer related to the borders of the arrondissements. The cantons of the arrondissement of Chalon-sur-Saône were, as of January 2015:

 Buxy
 Chagny
 Chalon-sur-Saône-Centre
 Chalon-sur-Saône-Nord
 Chalon-sur-Saône-Ouest
 Chalon-sur-Saône-Sud
 Givry
 Montceau-les-Mines-Nord
 Montceau-les-Mines-Sud
 Montchanin
 Mont-Saint-Vincent
 Saint-Germain-du-Plain
 Saint-Martin-en-Bresse
 Sennecey-le-Grand
 Verdun-sur-le-Doubs

References

Chalon-sur-Saone
Chalon-sur-Saône